Germán Jiménez Camarena [he-may'-nes] (born December 5, 1962) is a Mexican former starting pitcher in Major League Baseball who played for the Atlanta Braves during the  season. Listed at 5' 11", 200 lb., he batted and threw left-handed.

Jiménez was born in Santiago Ixcuintla, Nayarit.  As a teenager, he pitched for local Nayarit teams. In , he was a member of the Mexico national baseball team in the Amateur World Series, and later played for the Charros de Jalisco in the Mexican League. In 1988, he was purchased by the Braves from Jalisco and made his debut for the big team in the midseason.

In one season career, Jiménez posted a 1–6 record with a 5.01 ERA in 15 appearances, including nine starts, giving up 31 earned runs on 65 hits and 12 walks while striking out 26 in  innings of work. His only win came at expense of the New York Mets, 4–2, at Shea Stadium. After that, he was demoted to Double-A Greenville Braves in 1989 and had an 11–7 mark with a 3.48 ERA in 22 starts.

See also
1988 Atlanta Braves season
List of players from Mexico in Major League Baseball

References

External links

Braves 4, Mets 2 - box score

1962 births
Atlanta Braves players
Greenville Braves players
Living people
Major League Baseball pitchers
Major League Baseball players from Mexico
Mexican expatriate baseball players in the United States
Truchas de Toluca players
Sportspeople from Nayarit
People from Santiago Ixcuintla